Timeless Love is a studio album of standards by Smokey Robinson, released through New Door Records in 2006.  It reached No. 109 on the Billboard album chart. In 2007, the album was nominated for but did not win a Grammy Award for Best Traditional Pop Vocal Album.

Track listing

Standard edition
 "You Go to My Head" (John Frederick Coots, Haven Gillespie) – 4:31
 "I'm in the Mood for Love/Moody's Mood for Love" (Dorothy Fields, Jimmy McHugh) – 5:05
 "Our Love Is Here to Stay" (George Gershwin, Ira Gershwin) – 5:29
 "Fly Me to the Moon (In Other Words)" (Bart Howard) – 3:20
 "Night and Day" (Cole Porter) – 5:51
 "I'm Glad There Is You" (Jimmy Dorsey, Paul Mertz) – 3:40
 "More Than You Know" (Edward Eliscu, Billy Rose, Vincent Youmans) – 3:17
 "Speak Low" (Ogden Nash, Kurt Weill) – 4:09
 "Time After Time" (Cahn, Rob Hyman, Styne) – 5:10
 "I Can't Get You Anything But Love (Baby)" (Fields, McHugh) – 2:49
 "I Love Your Face" (Smokey Robinson) – 2:56
 "I've Got You Under My Skin" (Porter) – 4:29
 "Tea for Two" (Irving Caesar, Youmans) – 5:04

Target edition
All thirteen tracks from standard edition
Bonus tracks
 "You're In My Me" (Robinson) - 4:34
 "Happy" (Robinson, Michel Legrand) - 4:46
 "Smokey Robinson Interview" - 5:42

Personnel
Smokey Robinson - vocals
Bob "Boogie" Bowles, Ken Rosser, Marvin Tarplin, Paul Jackson Jr., Phil Upchurch - guitar
Larry Ball, Freddie Washington - bass
David Garfield - keyboards
Ricky Lawson, Tony Lewis, Gary Gold - drums
Paulinho da Costa - percussion
Ken Gioffre - saxophone, flute
Bobby Shew - trumpet
Los Angeles Strings Orchestra - strings
Harold Wheeler, Sonny Burke - arrangements

References

2006 albums
Smokey Robinson albums
albums produced by Smokey Robinson